ISPC may refer to:
 Point code, a unique address for a node
 Isoprene synthase, an enzyme
 Intel SPMD Program Compiler